The Tennessee House of Representatives 8th district in the United States is one of 99 legislative districts included in the lower house of the Tennessee General Assembly. It covers the some of Knoxville's suburbs in Blount County, with the exceptions of large portions of Maryville and Alcoa, and all of Friendsville and Louisville. The district includes downtown Maryville, Maryville College, Rockford, Walland, Townsend, McGhee Tyson Airport, and the Blount County portion of the Great Smoky Mountains National Park. The district shares a border with Knox County, Monroe County, and a protracted border with Sevier County. The district has been represented by Jerome Moon, since 2017.

Demographics 

 93.1% of the district is White
 2.7% of the district is African American
 2.0% of the district is Hispanic
 0.4% of the district is Asian
 1.8% of the district is another race

List of representatives 
In 1993, the district was redistricted from Greene County to where it is today. The following is a list of the representatives who have represented the HD-08 since 1993:

References 

Tennessee House of Representatives districts